The 2023 Bandy World Championship is an international bandy tournament between bandy playing nations. The tournament will be played in Åby, a subdivision of Växjö City in Sweden. Two separate tournaments for men's national teams and women's national teams will take place. This Bandy World Championship marks an important development for the sport at the international level. For the first time the men's world championships will take place at the same time and in the same arena as the Women's Bandy World Championship which serves as the international female equivalent for the sport known as the 2023 Women's Bandy World Championship. This article deals chiefly with the men's world competition.

According to original plans, the 2023 championship tournament would have been hosted by Russia, but since Russia is excluded from international play due to the Russo-Ukrainian War, the idea was brought forward during autumn of 2022 that a world championship should be arranged in Sweden instead. With the permission of the Federation of International Bandy, the Swedish Bandy Association therefore sent an invitation, in the form of an inquiry of interest, to all countries which at the 2019 Bandy World Championship qualified to compete in the A Division of the next world championship, except Russia. Countries invited are thus Finland, Norway, Kazakhstan, United States, Germany, Estonia, and Hungary. 

The national men's bandy teams from Latvia, Estonia, and Germany decided not to participate in the 2023 tournament. Other member national bandy federations which had previously competed but would not compete in 2023 stated costs as the main factor preventing them from participating in the event.

No A Division of a world championship has been played since 2019, which is why the qualification at that year’s championship has been the basis for the invitations. In 2020 the A Division was cancelled due to the COVID-19 pandemic and in 2021 there was no world championship at all for the same reason. The 2022 Bandy World Championship was to be played in Russia, but it was cancelled since most countries did not want to play in or against Russia following the 2022 Russian invasion of Ukraine. Four national teams decided to withdraw after the invasion began.

Venues
All matches will be played in Eriksson Arena, Åby.

A Division 
 Finland
 Kazakhstan
 Norway
 Sweden
 USA

B Division 
 Czech Republic
 Germany
 Hungary
 Netherlands
 Slovakia
 Switzerland

Round Robin Division A

Preliminary round

Final Round

Third place game

Final

Final ranking

Round Robin Division B

Preliminary round

Final Round

Semifinals

5th–6th place game

Third place game

Final

Final ranking

Sources

Bandy World Championships
World Championships
2023 in Swedish sport
International bandy competitions hosted by Sweden
Bandy World Championship
Bandy World Championship
Sports events affected by the 2022 Russian invasion of Ukraine